Frank Plasberg (born 18 May 1957) is a German journalist and television presenter.

Biography 
Born in Remscheid, Plasberg has an education in theatre, politics and pedagogy and works as television presenter on German broadcaster WDR. From 1987 to 2002, he was television host of programme Aktuelle Stunde (together with journalist Christine Westermann). Since 2001, Plasberg is television host of Hart aber fair ("hard but fair") on WDR, and nationwide on ARD since 2007.  He is known for his controversial role in the Gladbeck hostage crisis .

Plasberg was married with Angela Maas (born 1959); they have one son and one daughter. Since July 2007, he lives together with Anne Gesthuysen (born 1969). They married in August 2012. Her son was born in January 2011.

Awards 
 2003: Deutscher Fernsehpreis
 2005: Adolf-Grimme-Preis
 2005: Ernst Schneider Award
 2005: Hanns Joachim Friedrichs Award
 2006: Bayerischer Fernsehpreis in information for moderation of Hart aber fair
 2006: journalist of year in politics
 2008: Bambi in Category 'Moderation'

References

External links 
 
 
 Stefan Domke , Da habe ich einfach Angst bekommen, interview over Plasbergs behaviour during Gladbecker Geiseldramas, 13 August 2003, WDR  (German)
 Biographie, website of Hart aber fair
Felicitas von Lovenberg, Mir fehlt ein Gen für Milde, 9 June 2006, FAZ (German)
 Andreas Kötter, Jeder Moderator ist eitel, interview, 29 March 2005, Spiegel Online (German)

German journalists
German male journalists
German television presenters
German television talk show hosts
People from Remscheid
1957 births
Living people
German male writers
German television personalities
German broadcast news analysts
21st-century German journalists
ARD (broadcaster) people
Westdeutscher Rundfunk people